The Fair Haven Public Schools is a comprehensive community public school district that serves students in pre-kindergarten through eighth grade from Fair Haven, in Monmouth County, New Jersey, United States.

As of the 2018–19 school year, the district, comprising two schools, had an enrollment of 966 students and 88.1 classroom teachers (on an FTE basis), for a student–teacher ratio of 11.0:1.

The district is classified by the New Jersey Department of Education as being in District Factor Group "I", the second-highest of eight groupings. District Factor Groups organize districts statewide to allow comparison by common socioeconomic characteristics of the local districts. From lowest socioeconomic status to highest, the categories are A, B, CD, DE, FG, GH, I and J.

Students in public school for ninth through twelfth grades attend Rumson-Fair Haven Regional High School, together with students from Rumson, where the school is located. As of the 2018–19 school year, the high school had an enrollment of 983 students and 84.8 classroom teachers (on an FTE basis), for a student–teacher ratio of 11.6:1. In 2016, Newsweek ranked RFH the 144th best high school in the United States.

Schools
Schools in the district (with 2018–19 enrollment data from the National Center for Education Statistics) are:
Viola L. Sickles School wit 401 students in grades PreK-3
Marilyn Schwartz, Principal
Knollwood School with 564 students in grades 4-8
Amy Romano, Principal

Administration
Core members of the district's administration are:
Sean McNeil, Superintendent
David Joye, Business Administrator / Board Secretary

Board of education
The district's board of education, with nine members, sets policy and oversees the fiscal and educational operation of the district through its administration. As a Type II school district, the board's trustees are elected directly by voters to serve three-year terms of office on a staggered basis, with three seats up for election each year held (since 2012) as part of the November general election.

References

External links
Fair Haven Public Schools

School Data for the Fair Haven Public Schools, National Center for Education Statistics
Rumson-Fair Haven Regional High School District

Fair Haven, New Jersey
New Jersey District Factor Group I
School districts in Monmouth County, New Jersey